This list of castles in England is not a list of every building  and site that has "castle" as part of its name, nor does it list only buildings that conform to a strict definition of a castle as a medieval fortified residence. It is not a list of every castle ever built in England, many of which have vanished without trace, but is primarily a list of buildings and remains that have survived.  In almost every case the buildings that survive are either ruined, or have been altered over the centuries. For several reasons, whether a given site is that of a medieval castle has not been taken to be a sufficient criterion for determining whether or not that site should be included in the list.

Castles that have vanished or whose remains are barely visible are not listed, except for some important or well-known buildings and sites. Fortifications from before the medieval period are not listed, nor are architectural follies. In other respects it is difficult to identify clear and consistent boundaries between two sets of buildings, comprising those that indisputably belong in a list of castles and those that do not. The criteria adopted for inclusion in the list include such factors as: how much survives from the medieval period; how strongly fortified the building was; how castle-like the surviving building is; whether the building has been given the title of "castle"; how certain it is that a medieval castle stood on the site, or that the surviving remains are those of a medieval castle; how well-known or interesting the building is; and whether including or excluding a building helps make the list, in some measure, more consistent.

In order to establish a list that is as far as possible comprehensive as well as consistent, it is necessary to establish its boundaries. Before the list itself, a discussion of its scope includes lengthy lists of buildings excluded from the main lists for various reasons. The Castellarium Anglicanum, an authoritative index of castles in England and Wales published in 1983, lists over 1,500 castle sites in England. Many of these castles have vanished or left almost no trace. The present list includes more than 800 medieval castles of which there are visible remains, with over 300 having substantial surviving stone or brick remains.

History
 
A castle is a type of fortified structure, developed in Europe during the Middle Ages. The first castles appeared in France in the 10th century, and in England during the 11th century. A few castles are known to have been built in England before the Normans invaded in 1066; a great many were built in the years following, the principal mechanism by means of which the Normans were able to consolidate their control over the country. Whilst a few important castles, such as the White Tower in the Tower of London, were built of stone, most early castles were motte-and-bailey castles of earthwork and timber, which could be constructed quickly. Some were later rebuilt in stone, but there are a great many castle sites in England where all that is visible today are traces of earthworks.

Castles continued to be built in England for several hundred years, reaching a peak of military sophistication in the late 13th century. The two principal elements in their construction were the great tower or keep, such as the White Tower, and the fortified enclosure, such as is provided by the outer wall of the Tower of London. During the 14th century, largely as a result of the decline of feudalism, the construction of strong castles began to decline, in favour of more lightly fortified structures often described as fortified manor houses. In the far north of England, where conditions remained unsettled, fortified buildings continued to be built as late as the 16th century, not only by the rich and powerful but by any with adequate means, as defence not against great armies, but against the notorious Border Reivers. Many took the form of the pele tower, a smaller, more modest version of the castle keep, and many of these still survive, often incorporated in later buildings.

Castles differed from earlier fortifications in that they were generally private fortified residences. Typically, a castle was the residence of a feudal lord, providing the owner with a secure base from which to control his lands, and also a symbol of wealth and power. Earlier fortified structures, such as the Saxon burh or the Iron Age hill fort, provided public or communal defences, as did medieval town or city walls. The many Roman forts of which ruins survive in Britain differed in being wholly military in nature; they were camps or strongholds of the Roman army.  The Romans also built town or city walls in England, which can still be seen, for instance at Silchester.

By the 16th century the role of fortifications had changed once more with the development of artillery capable of breaching even thick stone walls. In the reign of Henry VIII, fears of invasion led to the building of a series of new fortresses along the south coast of England, known as the Device Forts or Henrician Castles. These were designed to use and to defend against artillery, and since they were not private residences, but national fortifications, they do not possess what architectural historians have come to see as the defining characteristics of a castle. Nonetheless they are visibly castle-like, being compact, with battlemented walls, squat turrets and sometimes a keep; and they were the last generation of fortresses in England to be known as castles, long before architectural historians began to argue that they should not be. One of them, Pendennis Castle, was one of the last Royalist strongholds to fall to the Parliamentarians during the English Civil War—starvation forcing surrender after a siege of five months.

As the role of the castle as a fortress declined in the later medieval period, its role as a residence increasingly became the more important. Castles such as Herstmonceux were built with fortifications seemingly designed more for show than for strength, implying a further evolution in the role and concept of the castle, becoming less a means of enforcing power but instead a symbol of its possession, a castle becoming a grand residence proclaiming the status of its owner. Once fortifications had become altogether redundant, it became increasingly rare in England for new buildings to be described as castles, in contrast to France, where country houses continued to be known as châteaux.

Once no longer needed as fortresses, castles — if they were not abandoned — were, over the centuries, adapted and modernised to make them more suitable for continued use as residences: large windows were inserted in defensive walls, as at Lumley; outer walls were demolished or lowered to open up views from within, as at Raby; new residential ranges were built to improve and extend accommodation, as at Windsor. Some castles were restored after falling into ruin, like Bamburgh; others, like Belvoir, were demolished and rebuilt, retaining little or none of the original structure. In the 18th and 19th centuries especially, many castles underwent "improvements" by architects such as Anthony Salvin, and in this period a fashion developed for entirely new houses to be built in the style of castles, and to be known as castles. Amongst these was Peckforton Castle, built by Salvin: a building so authentic in its recreation of a medieval castle that it has been described as possibly the last serious fortified home built in Britain.

Scope and exclusions
No list of castles in England is ever likely to be complete, because there will never be complete agreement in every case as to whether the remains of a building are those of a castle, whether a given place is the site of a castle, or whether a surviving building should be considered to be a castle.

Perhaps because the castle has become the most familiar type of fortification, many sites of fortifications earlier than the 10th century have become known as castles. Most of these are Iron Age hill forts.  Amongst the best known are Abbotsbury Castle, Barbury Castle, Bratton Castle, Cadbury Castle, Castle Dore, Chûn Castle, Liddington Castle, Maen Castle, Maiden Castle and Uffington Castle, whilst many more appear in the List of hill forts in England. Others, such as Melandra Castle, Reculver Castle, Richborough Castle and Whitley Castle, are Roman forts, whilst Daw's Castle is a Saxon burh. None of these is included in the present list unless it is also the site of a medieval castle, as is the case with, for instance, Portchester Castle, where an imposing castle was built within the surviving walls of the Roman fort.

Nor are all medieval fortified sites included in the present list. The remains of town and city walls are excluded—most of these appear in the List of town walls in England and Wales. Also excluded are churches with defensive towers, such as Ancroft, Burgh by Sands, Edlingham, Garway, Great Salkeld and Newton Arlosh, as well as other fortified ecclesiastical sites such as Alnwick Abbey, Battle Abbey, Thornton Abbey, Wetheral Priory, Whalley Abbey and St Mary's Abbey, York. Some of the pele towers of Northern England are included, but the more modest fortified buildings known as bastles are not, though the distinction between them is not always altogether clear. Amongst fortified manor houses, those given the title of castle are included, whilst many others were more lightly fortified and are excluded. Amongst these are Baddesley Clinton, Cowdray House, Farnhill Hall, Hipswell Hall, Ightham Mote, Little Wenham Hall, Markenfield Hall and Walburn Hall.

The list includes pele towers that became known as castles, or preserve a castle-like aspect. Many others, or their remains, survive much altered—incorporated in later country houses or farmhouses, and are excluded. Amongst these are: Aske Hall, Biddlestone RC Chapel, Bolling Hall, Bolton Old Hall, Boltongate Rectory, Causey Park House, Clennell Hall, Cliburn Hall, Corbridge Low Hall, Cowmire Hall, Craster Arms (Beadnell), Croglin Old Pele, Denton Hall, Dovenby Hall, Dunstan Hall, East Shaftoe Hall, Godmond Hall, Great Salkeld Rectory, Hardrigg Hall, Hepscott Hall, Hetton Hall, Hollin Hall, Hutton Hall (Penrith), Irton Hall, Johnby Hall, Killington Hall, Kirkoswald College, Levens Hall, Little Harle Tower, Nether Hall, Netherby Hall, Ormside Hall, Pockerley Pele, Preston Patrick Hall, Randalholme Hall, Rock Hall, Rudchester Hall, Sella Park, Selside Hall, Skelsmergh Hall, Smardale Hall, Thistlewood Farmhouse, Warnell Hall, Weetwood Hall and Witton Tower.

In the post-medieval period, the distinction between true castles and later mock castles is blurred by the extent to which medieval castles were adapted and rebuilt. At Greystoke a new castle was built incorporating a medieval pele tower; at Thurland a new castle was built from the ruins of the old; at Belvoir the old castle was demolished and a new one built. The building of mock castles might be seen as the logical conclusion of a process already apparent in castles such as Herstmonceux or Tattershall, where the castle-like aspect of the building was becoming more for show than for strength.

Amongst post-medieval buildings in England that are known as castles, a few, such as Peckforton Castle, closely resemble medieval castles. Many others, such as Clearwell Castle, have some castle-like features, and some, like Mereworth Castle, bear no resemblance whatsoever to a castle. The list excludes buildings that neither look like castles, nor incorporate the remains of castles. Amongst these are Bolebroke Castle, Bovey Castle, Bruce Castle, Castle Ashby, Castle Howard, Clifton Castle, Highclere Castle, Mereworth Castle, New Wardour Castle, Sherborne Castle, Wentworth Castle, and Wisbech Castle. Many other buildings with some castle-like features are also excluded. Amongst these are Acton Castle, Allerton Castle, Augill Castle, Avon Castle, Bell's Castle, Bolesworth Castle, Bude Castle, Castle Eden Castle, Castle Goring, Cave Castle, Clearwell Castle, Cliffe Castle, Coates Castle, Creech Castle, Droskyn Castle, Edmond Castle, Enmore Castle, Ewell Castle, Farleigh Castle, Farley Castle, Fillingham Castle, Hatherop Castle, Headingley Castle, Highcliffe Castle, Hilfield Castle, Kenwith Castle, Kirby Knowle Castle, Knepp Castle, Luscombe Castle, Midford Castle, Mulgrave Castle, Otterburn Tower, Pentillie Castle, Reeve Castle, Ryde Castle, St. Clare Castle, Sibdon Castle, Sneaton Castle, Stanhope Castle, Studley Castle, Swinton Castle, The Citadel (Weston-under-Redcastle), Tregenna Castle, Vanbrugh Castle, Wadhurst Castle, Wattisham Castle, Whitehaven Castle, Whitstable Castle, Willersley Castle, and Willsbridge Castle.  Amongst those that have been demolished is Steephill Castle.

Artificial ruins and follies, often built as memorials or landscape features, are also excluded. Amongst these are Appley Tower, Black Castle, Bladon Castle, Blaise Castle, Bollitree Castle, Boston Castle, Braylsham Castle, Broadway Tower, Carr Hall Castle, Castlebourne, Clent Castle, Clopton Tower, Dinton Castle, Doyden Castle, Dunstall Castle, Durlston Castle, Fort Putnam, Hadlow Castle, Castle in Hagley Park Lawrence Castle, Long's Park Castle, Mow Cop Castle, Mowbray Castle, Pirton Castle, Radford Castle, Radway Tower, Ragged Castle (Badminton), Rivington Castle, Rodborough Fort, Ross Castle, Rothley Castle, Roundhay Castle, Sebergham Castle, Severndroog Castle, Shaldon Castle, Sham Castle (Bath), Sledmere Castle, Speedwell Castle, Stainborough Castle, Starlight Castle, Stowe Castle, Strattenborough Castle, Sundorne Castle, Toll House (Clevedon) and Wyke Castle. Finally, the 16th-century Henrician Castles, whose design was closely inspired by medieval castles, are included, but later military fortifications—with just a few exceptions—are not.

However carefully the criteria for including a building or site on this list are set out, borderline cases are inevitable. Many buildings known to incorporate northern pele towers in their fabric, but are no longer castle-like—such as the Red Lion Tower in Haltwhistle—have been excluded. On the other hand, Corby Castle, in which a pele tower survives wholly encased in a later building, is included because it is known as a castle, and by implication continued to fulfil the role of one, at least in part.  Kimbolton Castle is included as the site of a medieval castle, and because the present mansion has a castellated aspect in deference to the medieval castle it replaced.

Key

Bedfordshire

Castles of which only earthworks, fragments or nothing remains include:

† Bedford Castle was demolished after a well-documented eight-week siege by Henry III, with around 2000 men, in 1224.

Berkshire

Castles of which only earthworks, fragments or nothing remains include:

Bristol

Castles of which only vestiges remain include:

Buckinghamshire

Castles of which only earthworks, fragments or nothing remains include:

Cambridgeshire

Castles of which only earthworks, fragments or nothing remains include:

Cheshire

Castles of which only earthworks, fragments or nothing remains include:

County Durham

Castles of which only earthworks or vestiges remain include:

Cornwall

Castles of which little or nothing remains include:

Cumbria

Castles of which only earthworks, vestiges or no traces remain include:

Derbyshire

Castles of which only earthworks, vestiges or no traces remain include:

Devon

Castles of which only earthworks or vestiges remain include:

Dorset

Castles of which only earthworks, fragments or nothing remains include:

East Riding of Yorkshire

Castles of which only earthworks, fragments or nothing remains include:

East Sussex

Castles of which little or nothing remains include:

Essex

Castles of which only earthworks remain include:

† Pleshey Castle is a good example of a motte-and-bailey castle: only earthworks and a medieval brick bridge remain.

Gloucestershire

Castles of which only earthworks, fragments or nothing remains include:

Greater London

Castles of which no traces remain include:

The table does not include The White House, a replica of a Polish palace in London.

Greater Manchester

Castles of which only earthworks, fragments or nothing remains include:

Hampshire

Castles of which only earthworks or vestiges remain include:

Herefordshire

Castles of which little or no traces remain include:

† Ewyas Harold Castle is recorded in the Domesday Book and was probably built c. 1048.

Hertfordshire

Castles of which only earthworks, fragments or nothing remains include:

Isle of Wight

Castles of which little or nothing remains include:

Isles of Scilly

Castles of which only vestiges remain include:

Kent

Castles of which little or nothing remains include:

Lancashire

Castles of which only earthworks or vestiges remain include:

Leicestershire

Castles of which only earthworks or vestiges remain include:

Lincolnshire

Castles of which only earthworks or vestiges remain include:

† Goltho Castle was built on the site of a Saxon fortified dwelling of c. 850, established by excavation.

Merseyside

Castles of which little or no traces remain include:

Norfolk

Castles of which only earthworks or vestiges remain include:

Northamptonshire

Castles of which little or no traces remain include:

† Fotheringhay Castle was the scene of the trial and execution of Mary, Queen of Scots in 1587.

Northumberland

Castles of which little or nothing remains include:

North Yorkshire

Castles of which little remains include:

Nottinghamshire

Castles of which little remains include:

Oxfordshire

Castles of which little or nothing remains include:

Rutland

Castles of which little or nothing remains include:

Shropshire

Castles of which only earthworks or vestiges remain include:

Somerset

Castles of which only earthworks or no traces remain include:

South Yorkshire

Castles of which only earthworks, fragments or nothing remains include:

Staffordshire

Castles of which little or nothing remains include:

Suffolk

Castles of which only earthworks or no traces remain include:

Surrey

Castles of which only little or no traces remain include:

Tyne and Wear

Castles of which little remains include:

Warwickshire

Castles of which only earthworks or vestiges remain include:

West Midlands

Castles of which little or no traces remain include:

West Sussex

Castles of which only little or no traces remain include:

West Yorkshire

Castles of which only earthworks or no traces remain include:

Wiltshire

Castles of which only little or no traces remain include:

Worcestershire

Castles of which only earthworks remain include:

See also
British military history
Castles in Great Britain and Ireland
Castles in Northern Ireland
Castles in Scotland
Castles in the Isle of Man
Castles in Wales
List of castles

References
Key to sources
BLB – British Listed Buildings website (retrieved March 2011; last accessed 5 October 2012)
PSC – Pastscape website (retrieved September 2011; last accessed 5 October 2012)

Bibliography
Blair, John (1998) Anglo-Saxon Oxfordshire London: Sutton. .
Brown, R. Allen (1962) English Castles London: Batsford. .
Creighton, Oliver (2002) Castles and Landscapes London: Continuum. .
Elton, Geoffrey R. (1991) England Under the Tudors London: Routledge. .
Emery, Anthony (1996) Greater Medieval Houses of England and Wales, 1300-1500: Volume 1, Northern England Cambridge: Cambridge University Press. 
Harrington, Peter (2007) The Castles of Henry VIII Oxford: Osprey. .

Higham, Robert; Barker, Philip (1992) Timber Castles London: Batsford. .
Impey, Edward; Parnell, Geoffrey (2000) The Tower of London: The Official Illustrated History Merrell Publishers in association with Historic Royal Palaces. .
King, D.J. Cathcart (1983) Castellarium Anglicanum: An Index and Bibliography of the Castles in England, Wales and the Islands London: Kraus International Publications .
King, D.J. Cathcart (1988) The Castle in England and Wales: An Interpretative History London: Croom Helm. .
 
Thompson, Michael (1987) The Decline of the Castle Cambridge: Cambridge University Press. .

External links

Castles in England
England
 
Castles in England